The Malal dam is a dam in Saudi Arabia opened in 2003 and located in Madinah region.

See also 
 List of dams in Saudi Arabia

References 

Dams in Saudi Arabia